Aharon Dolgopolsky, also spelled Aron (18 November 1930 – 20 July 2012) was a Russian-Israeli linguist who is known as one of the modern founders of comparative Nostratic linguistics.

Biography
Born in Moscow, he arrived at the long-forgotten Nostratic hypothesis in the 1960s, at around the same time but independently of Vladislav Illich-Svitych. Together with Illich-Svitych, he was the first to undertake a multilateral comparison of the supposed daughter languages of Nostratic. Teaching Nostratics at Moscow University for 8 years, Dolgopolsky moved to Israel in 1976, and taught at the University of Haifa.

Dolgopolsky was featured in the NOVA documentary, In search of the first language.

He died on 20 July 2012 in Haifa.

See also
Dolgopolsky list
Moscow School of Comparative Linguistics

References

External links
 Aharon Dolgopolsky's Nostratic Dictionary
 

1930 births
2012 deaths
Academic staff of Moscow State University
Russian Jews
Soviet emigrants to Israel
Israeli people of Russian-Jewish descent
Linguists from Israel
Linguists from Russia
Linguists from the Soviet Union
20th-century linguists
Jewish scientists
Paleolinguists
Linguists of Nostratic languages
Linguists of Eurasiatic languages
Long-range comparative linguists
Moscow School of Comparative Linguistics
Academic staff of the University of Haifa